Changes One may refer to:

 Changesonebowie, a 1976 David Bowie compilation album
 Changes One (Charles Mingus album), 1974